WorldBox is a sandbox game that was released in 2012 by indie game developer Maxim Karpenko. The game allows the use of different elements to create, change, and destroy virtual worlds.

Gameplay 
The game's main feature is the ability to create worlds, using godlike tools known as "God powers" provided in the game. These are divided into several groups: World Creation, Civilizations, Creatures, Nature and Disasters, Destruction Powers, and Other Powers. Conversely, the game also allows the destruction of worlds, ranging from explosives to natural disasters, such as earthquakes, volcanoes, and acid rain. Populations can also be reduced with hostile entities, illnesses, etc. Worlds can also, as of version 0.21, go through "ages", which can affect biomes and creatures, both negatively and positively. 

Some creatures are able to create civilizations (humans, orcs, elves and dwarves). Such civilizations can grow, declare war on each other, and suffer rebellions. Beginning with version 0.14, players are also able to customise the banners and symbols of kingdoms, along with the ability to control the traits of creatures, adding more content and depth to the gameplay. Beginning with version 0.21, kingdoms can form alliances, and kings can form clans.

Development 
Karpenko started working on the game back in 2011, and published the first prototype on Flash in the same year. In 2012, he released it on Newgrounds. The Newgrounds version is still available, but not playable due to Adobe Flash support ending.

He continued working on the game for several years, and released it on IOS in December 2018, with the Android version coming in early February 2019. He proceeded to work on the game and released it for PC in October 2019. The Steam version would only come more than 2 years later in December 2021.

In early March 2022, he stated that he would delay the next content update for the game due to Russia's invasion of Ukraine. He released the next content update (0.14) 2 months later in May 2022. According to his Twitter, he planned to release the next update in mid-December 2022. The update was later delayed and ultimately released 4 months later, on 12 March 2023, to Steam, and on Android and IOS between March 13 to 14.

Reception 
As of November 27, 2022, WorldBox has more than 14 000 reviews on Steam, with 94% of them being positive, giving the game a "Very Positive" rating.

Graham Smith of Rock Paper Shotgun wrote: "I'd probably had my fill of WorldBox after around 4 hours, but it was a happy four hours."

Joseph Knoop of PC Gamer wrote: "It's funny how much WorldBox shares with big strategy games, despite not presenting an ultimate goal to the player, and almost always ending with a boredom-killing nuclear bomb. Watching the borders of a kingdom stretch, retract, and suddenly disappear tickles a part of my brain that really likes to be tickled. Considering WorldBox is about to become an Early Access game on Steam, I'm eager to see what other maniacal tools get added to the toybox."

2020 plagiarism scandal 
In November 2020, Maxim reported that a shell company known as Stavrio LTD copied WorldBox after he refused to let them buy it at a DevGAMM conference the previous year, and attempted to trademark the name. This resulted in Maxim attempting to get Google Play to take action against the company by starting the hashtag "#saveworldbox".

See also 
 List of god video games

References

External links 

 Official website

Open-world video games
God games
IOS games
Android (operating system) games
Windows games
2012 video games